Carl Robinson (born 13 October 1976) is a retired Welsh international  footballer who played as a central midfielder. He is currently the assistant coach for Major League Soccer club D.C. United.

Club career

Wolverhampton Wanderers
Robinson started his career as a trainee with Wolverhampton Wanderers. He was promoted to the first-team for the 1995–96 season.

Loan to Shrewsbury Town
On 28 March 1996, Robinson was sent on loan to Shrewsbury Town for the remainder of the season to gain first-team experience. Two days later, Robinson made his professional debut against Hull City in a 1–1 draw at Gay Meadow in front of 2,346 supporters. He made five appearances for The Shrews: four in the league and one in The Football League Trophy final at Wembley Stadium in a 2–1 defeat against Rotherham United on 14 April 1996.

Return to Wolves
Following his loan spell at Shrewsbury Town, Robinson returned to Wolves for the 1996–97 season, making his club debut that year. He would go on to become a regular with the first-team over the next six seasons as the club challenged regularly for promotion to the Premier League and made a memorable run to the semifinals of the 1997–98 FA Cup, losing to eventual champions Arsenal. Robinson was released by Wolves in June 2002 at the expiry of his contract.

Portsmouth
After over 180 appearances for Wolves over six seasons, he moved to Portsmouth in July 2002 under the Bosman ruling. He played 15 league games for Portsmouth in the first half of their Championship season before finishing the season with loan spells at Sheffield Wednesday (where he scored once against future club Norwich) and Walsall, where he scored once against Bradford. The following season he was loaned out again, this time to Rotherham, Sheffield United and Sunderland. However between these loan spells he did return to Portsmouth to make one Premier League appearance against Chelsea.

Sunderland
After impressing at Sunderland he signed a three-year deal in June 2004. He then went on to collect another championship winners medal as they gained promotion during a season in which he played 42 of 46 matches to become a fan’s favourite.

Norwich City
After a loan spell with Norwich City, he signed for The Canaries permanently on a 2.5 year deal for an undisclosed fee in January 2006. Robinson scored his first goal for Norwich in a 5–1 win against Barnsley on 26 August 2006.

Toronto FC
On 31 January 2007, Robinson joined Toronto FC from Norwich after just over a year at Carrow Road, even though he still had 18 months remaining on his deal with Norwich. He scored his first MLS goal when he netted Toronto's third in a 4–0 win against FC Dallas on 17 June 2007. He was voted team MVP in his first year and repeated in his second year at the club.

New York Red Bulls
In March 2010 he was traded from Toronto FC to the New York Red Bulls to join Hans Backe for a fourth-round pick in the 2011 MLS SuperDraft. On 20 March 2010, Robinson started for New York in a 3–1 victory against Santos FC, which was the first match played at the new Red Bull Arena. On 21 August 2010, he scored his first goal for New York Red Bulls in a 4–1 road victory against his old club Toronto FC and refused to celebrate due to his relationship with the supporters. During his time at New York Red Bulls he became a player coach.

International career
A Wales international player, Robinson made his debut against Belarus in 1999, winning the man of the match award. His 50th cap came in the 2–0 World Cup Qualifier victory over Liechtenstein. On 1 April 2009, Robinson announced his retirement from international football at the age of 32 with 52 caps after Wales suffered two consecutive defeats, making it virtually impossible for them to qualify for the 2010 FIFA World Cup.

Managerial career

Vancouver Whitecaps FC
In January 2012, Robinson retired as a player and joined the Vancouver Whitecaps FC as an assistant coach. He took over as the head coach of the club in December 2013. The club parted ways with Robinson on 25 September with 5 games remaining in the 2018 season after just under 5 years. He amassed just under 200 games as Caps boss in his stay.

Newcastle Jets
In February 2020, Robinson signed a three-and-a-half-year contract as the head coach of Australian A-League club Newcastle Jets.  On 14 October 2020, the Jets announced that Robinson was in talks with Western Sydney Wanderers.

Western Sydney Wanderers
On 15 October 2020, Western Sydney Wanderers announced the signing of Robinson from Newcastle Jets. On 30 January 2022 Wanderers relieved Robinson of his duties and thanked him for his time at the club.

Career statistics

Playing career

Managerial statistics

Honours

Player

Club

Shrewsbury Town
Football League Trophy runner-up: 1995–96

Portsmouth
 Championship winner / Promotion to Premier League – 2001/2

Sunderland 
 Championship winner / Promotion to Premier League – 2004/5

Individual
 Red Patch Boys Player of the Year: 2007 & 2008
Sunderland Fans player of year 2004

Manager

Vancouver Whitecaps
2014 – Western conference playoffs 
2015 – Runner up Western Conference / Western conference semifinals 
2015 – Coach of year candidate
2015 – Canadian Voyageurs Cup winner 
2016 – Concacaf Champions league semifinals
2016 – Canadian Voyageurs Cup runner-up 
2017 – Western Conference semifinals 
2017 – Coach of year candidate 
2018 – Canadian Voyageurs Cup runner-up

Newcastle Jets
 Coach of year candidate: 2020

References

External links
 
 
 Biography  at BBC Mid-Wales

1976 births
Living people
People from Llandrindod Wells
Sportspeople from Powys
Expatriate soccer managers in Canada
Expatriate soccer players in Canada
Expatriate soccer players in the United States
Association football midfielders
Major League Soccer players
Norwich City F.C. players
Portsmouth F.C. players
Premier League players
New York Red Bulls players
Rotherham United F.C. players
Sheffield United F.C. players
Sheffield Wednesday F.C. players
Shrewsbury Town F.C. players
Sunderland A.F.C. players
English Football League players
Toronto FC players
Vancouver Whitecaps FC coaches
Newcastle Jets FC managers
Western Sydney Wanderers FC managers
Wales international footballers
Wales under-21 international footballers
Walsall F.C. players
Welsh expatriate football managers
Welsh expatriate footballers
Welsh expatriate sportspeople in Canada
Welsh football managers
Welsh footballers
Wolverhampton Wanderers F.C. players
Vancouver Whitecaps FC non-playing staff
Welsh expatriate sportspeople in the United States